is a Japanese kickboxer and Muay Thai fighter, currently signed with RISE, where he is the current RISE Super Flyweight champion.

As of December 2022, Combat Press ranks him as the #1 strawweight (-54 kg) and #4 pound for pound kickboxer in the world, while Beyond Kick ranks him as the #1 flyweight (-53 kg) and #5 pound for pound kickboxer in the world.

Martial arts career

Muay thai career
Osaki made his professional debut against Yuzuki Sakai at MUAYTHAI WINDY SUPER FIGHT. He won the fight by unanimous decision. He won his next fight against Kaito Gibu as well, before suffering his first professional loss to Banfus Hunter at MUAYTHAI WINDY SUPER FIGHT vol.17. Osaki would go on to amass a 7-1-2 (1) record, before fighting Yuya Kosaka for the WMC Japan Flyweight title at Muay Lok 2017 1st. He won the fight by unanimous decision.

Osaki won his next six fights, including four straight victories at the Lumpinee Stadium. He was scheduled to defend his WMC title for the first time against Taiga Nakayama at The Battle Of Muaythai 17. Osaki won the fight by majority decision. In his next fight he won the Lumpinee Stadium of Japan Flyweight title, with a knockout of Tatsuya Hibata. He afterwards fought Kiew Parunchai for the Lumpinee Stadium 112 lbs belt, but lost the fight by decision.

Transition to kickboxing

KNOCK OUT
Osaki made his KNOCK OUT debut against Tatsuya Noto at KNOCK OUT SUMMER FES.2018 on August 19, 2018, in the quarterfinals of the 2018 flyweight tournament, held to crown the King of Knock Out flyweight champion. He won the fight by a second-round technical knockout, knocking him down twice before the referee waved the fight off. Osaki advanced to the tournament semifinals, held at KNOCK OUT 2018 cross over on October 7, 2018, where he faced Yoshiho Tane. He won the fight by a fifth-round technical knockout. Osaki faced Issei Ishii at KING OF KNOCK OUT 2018 on December 9, 2018, in the finals of the tournament. He lost the fight by a narrow majority decision. Two of the judges scored the fight 49–48 for Ishii, while the third judge scored it as an even 49–49 draw.

Osaki made his fourth appearance with the promotion against Chokdee PK.Saenchaimuaythaigym at KNOCK OUT 2019 WINTER on February 11, 2019. He lost the fight by unanimous decision, with two scorecards of 49–46 and one scorecard of 48–46.

HOOST CUP
Osaki returned to Hoost Cup to face KING Takeshi at HOOST CUP KINGS NAGOYA 6 on May 26, 2019. He won the fight by unanimous decision, after an extra fourth round was contested.

Osaki faced the former two-time Krush Super Bantamweight champion Shota Takiya at Rizin 18 - Nagoya on August 18, 2019. He won the fight by a wide unanimous decision. Osaki knocked Takiya down twice, first with a left hook to the body in the second round and the second time with a right hook in the third round.

Osaki faced Koudai Hirayama at HOOST CUP KINGS OSAKA 4 on October 27, 2019. He won the fight by a close majority decision, with scores of 30–29, 29–29 and 30–29.

Osaki faced Konesarn Acegym at Norainu Matsuri 6 Shin Kiba 1st Ring on January 19, 2020. He stopped Konesarn with low kicks at the 2:53 minute mark of the opening round.

RISE

Early promotional career
Osaki made his RISE debut against Kazane, who entered the fight on a five-fight winning streak, at RISE 137 on February 23, 2020. He won the fight by unanimous decision. Two of the judges scored the fight 29–27 in his favor, while the third judge awarded all three rounds of the bout to him. Osaki knocked his opponent down with a right hook midway through the second round.

Osaki faced the #1 ranked RISE super flyweight contender Jin Mandokoro at RISE 140 on July 19, 2020, in a title eliminator bout. The fight was ruled a majority decision draw after the first three rounds were contested, with one judge scoring the bout 29–28 for Osaki. Osaki was awarded a majority decision win after an extra fourth round was contested.

Super flyweight champion
Osaki, who as at the time the top ranked contender, challenged Toki Tamaru for the RISE Super Flyweight (-53 kg) Championship at RISE 142 on September 4, 2020. Due to measures implemented to combat the COVID-19 pandemic, only a limited audience of 700 people was allowed into the Korakuen Hall, where the title bout took place. Osaki captured the title by unanimous decision. Two judges scored the fight 49–47 in his favor, while the third judge scored it 50–47 for him.

Osaki faced the Shootboxing Japan bantamweight champion Kyo Kawakami in a non-title bout at RISE 143 on November 14, 2020. He beat Kawakami by unanimous decision, with scores of 30–29, 29–28 and 30–28. 

Osaki faced the WMC and WBC Muaythai bantamweight champion Ikko in a non-title bout at RISE 146 on February 23, 2021. He won the fight by unanimous decision, with two scorecards of 29–28 and one scorecard of 30–28. Osaki was next expected to face Shiro at "Rise on Abema" on May 15, 2021, in a bantamweight (-55 kg) bout. His brother Koki Osaki tested positive for COVID-19 on May 12, which led to the fight being scrapped as a preventive measure.

Osaki faced Issei Ishii at RISE WORLD SERIES 2021 Osaka on July 18, 2021, in the quarterfinals of the 2021 RISE Dead or Alive 53 kg tournament. The pair previously fought on December 9, 2018, with Ishii winning by majority decision. Osaki won the rematch by unanimous decision, with scores of 29–28, 29–28 and 29–27. He scored the sole knockdown of the fight in the second round, as he dropped Ishii with a left hook. Advancing to the tournament semifinals, Osaki was expected to face Shiro at RISE WORLD SERIES 2021 Yokohama on September 23, 2021, in the tournament semifinals. Osaki withdrew from the bout with an ankle injury on August 24, and was replaced by his brother Koki Osaki.

Osaki was booked to face Kanta Tabuchi in a non-title bout at RISE 156 on March 27, 2022. He won the fight by majority decision, with scores of 30–29, 30–29 and 30–30. Osaki then faced Sanchai TeppenGym in another non-title bout at RISE WORLD SERIES 2022 Osaka on August 21, 2022. He won the fight by a third-round knockout.

Osaki made his first RISE super flyweight (-53  kg) title defense against the 2021 RISE super flyweight Dead or Alive Tournament winner and the number one ranked contender Kazane at RISE Word Series 2022 on October 15, 2022. He won the fight by a narrowly contested majority decision, with scores of 50–49, 48–48 and 49–48.

Osaki was booked to face Mangkon Boomdeksean in a non-title bout at RISE 164 on January 28, 2023. He won the fight by a third-round technical knockout. Osaki knocked Mangkon down three times inside of single round, which forced the referee to stop the contest.

Osaki faced Javier Cecilio at RISE ELDORADO 2023 on March 26, 2023.

Championships and accomplishments
World Muaythai Council
 2017 WMC Japan Flyweight Champion
Lumpinee Stadium of Japan
 2018 LPNJ Flyweight Champion
KNOCK OUT
2018 King of Knock Out Super Flyweight Tournament Runner-up
RISE
 2020 RISE Super Flyweight (-53 kg) Champion
 One successful title defense

Fight record

|-  style="text-align:center; background:#"
| 2023-03-26 || ||align=left| Javier Cecilio || RISE ELDORADO 2023 || Tokyo, Japan ||  || ||
|-
|-  style="text-align:center; background:#cfc"
| 2023-01-28 || Win ||align=left| Mangkon Boomdeksian || RISE 164 || Tokyo, Japan|| TKO (Three knockdowns) || 2 || 2:20
|-
|-  style="text-align:center; background:#cfc"
| 2022-10-15 || Win ||align=left| Kazane|| RISE World Series 2022 || Tokyo, Japan || Decision (Majority) || 5 || 3:00
|-
! style=background:white colspan=9 |
|-  style="background:#cfc;"
| 2022-08-21|| Win ||align=left| Sanchai TeppenGym || RISE WORLD SERIES 2022 Osaka || Osaka, Japan || KO (Left hook)|| 3 ||1:45  
|-  style="text-align:center; background:#cfc"
| 2022-03-27|| Win||align=left| Kanta Tabuchi || RISE 156 || Tokyo, Japan ||Decision (Majority)|| 3||3:00 
|-  style="text-align:center; background:#cfc;"
| 2021-07-18|| Win ||align=left| Issei Ishii || RISE WORLD SERIES 2021 Osaka - Dead or Alive Tournament, Quarter Final || Osaka, Japan || Decision (Unanimous) || 3|| 3:00
|-  style="text-align:center; background:#cfc;"
| 2021-02-23 ||Win||align=left| Ikko|| RISE 146 || Tokyo, Japan||Decision (Majority)|| 3 || 3:00
|-  style="text-align:center; background:#cfc;"
| 2020-11-14 ||Win||align=left| Kyo Kawakami || RISE 143 || Tokyo, Japan||Decision (Unanimous)|| 3 || 3:00
|-  style="text-align:center; background:#cfc;"
| 2020-09-04 ||Win ||align=left| Toki Tamaru|| RISE 142 || Tokyo, Japan|| Decision (Unanimous)|| 5 || 3:00 
|-
! style=background:white colspan=9 |
|-  style="text-align:center; background:#cfc;"
| 2020-07-19 || Win ||align=left| Jin Mandokoro|| RISE 140 || Tokyo, Japan|| Ext.R Decision (Majority) || 4 || 3:00
|-  style="text-align:center; background:#cfc;"
| 2020-02-23 ||Win||align=left| Kazane || RISE 137 || Tokyo, Japan|| Decision (Unanimous) || 3 || 3:00
|-  style="text-align:center; background:#cfc;"
| 2020-01-19 ||Win||align=left| Konesarn Acegym || Norainu Matsuri 6 Shin Kiba 1st Ring || Tokyo, Japan|| KO (Low Kick) || 1 || 2:53
|-  style="text-align:center; background:#CCFFCC;"
| 2019-12-15 ||Win||align=left| Choi Seok Hee || HOOST CUP KINGS NAGOYA 7 || Nagoya, Japan|| TKO (Ref. Stoppage/Punches) || 2 || 2:57
|-  style="text-align:center; background:#CCFFCC;"
| 2019-10-27 ||Win ||align=left| Koudai || HOOST CUP KINGS OSAKA 4 || Osaka, Japan|| Decision (Majority) || 3 || 3:00
|-  style="text-align:center; background:#CCFFCC;"
| 2019-08-18 || Win ||align=left| Shota Takiya || Rizin 18 - Nagoya || Nagoya, Japan|| Decision (Unanimous)|| 3 || 3:00
|-  style="text-align:center; background:#CCFFCC;"
| 2019-06-22|| Win ||align=left||| Lumpinee Stadium || Bangkok, Thailand || KO ||  ||
|-  style="text-align:center; background:#CCFFCC;"
| 2019-05-26 || Win||align=left| KING Takeshi || HOOST CUP KINGS NAGOYA 6 || Nagoya, Japan|| Ext.R Decision (Unanimous) || 4 || 3:00
|-  style="text-align:center; background:#FFBBBB;"
| 2019-02-11 || Loss ||align=left| Chokdee PK.Saenchaimuaythaigym || KNOCK OUT 2019 WINTER || Tokyo, Japan|| Decision (Unanimous) || 5 || 3:00
|-  style="text-align:center; background:#FFBBBB;"
| 2018-12-09 || Loss ||align=left| Issei Ishii || KING OF KNOCK OUT 2018, Tournament Final || Tokyo, Japan|| Decision (Majority) || 5 || 3:00
|-
! style=background:white colspan=9 |
|-  style="text-align:center; background:#CCFFCC;"
| 2018-10-07 || Win ||align=left| Yoshiho Tane|| KNOCK OUT 2018 CROSS OVER, Tournament Semifinal || Tokyo, Japan|| TKO (Ref. Stoppage)|| 5 || 1:35
|-  style="text-align:center; background:#CCFFCC;"
| 2018-08-19 || Win ||align=left| Tatsuya Noto || KNOCK OUT SUMMER FES.2018, Tournament Quarterfinal || Tokyo, Japan|| TKO (Punches)|| 2 || 1:12
|-  style="text-align:center; background:#FFBBBB;"
| 2018-06-15 || Loss ||align=left| Kiew Parunchai || Lumpinee Stadium || Bangkok, Thailand|| Decision || 5 || 3:00 
|-
! style=background:white colspan=9 |
|-  style="text-align:center; background:#CCFFCC;"
| 2018-04-30 || Win ||align=left| Tatsuya Hibata || Muay thai Open 41|| Tokyo, Japan|| KO (Knee)|| 2 || 2:45
|-
! style=background:white colspan=9 |
|-  style="text-align:center; background:#CCFFCC;"
| 2018-04-08 || Win ||align=left| Taiga Nakayama || The Battle Of Muaythai 17 || Tokyo, Japan|| Decision (Majority) || 5 || 3:00
|-
! style=background:white colspan=9 |
|-  style="text-align:center; background:#CCFFCC;"
| 2018-02-24 || Win ||align=left| Samsayam Siriliakmuaythai ||  Lumpinee Stadium || Bangkok, Thailand|| KO (Knees) || 1 ||
|-  style="text-align:center; background:#CCFFCC;"
| 2018-01-27 || Win ||align=left| Attachai Sitkunthap||  Lumpinee Stadium || Bangkok, Thailand|| TKO (Ref. Stoppage/Punches) || 2 ||
|-  style="text-align:center; background:#CCFFCC;"
| 2017-12-02 || Win ||align=left| Suarek Lianplaza ||  Lumpinee Stadium || Bangkok, Thailand|| KO (Left Hook) || 1 ||
|-  style="text-align:center; background:#CCFFCC;"
| 2017-11-04 || Win ||align=left| Changpueknoi Warriormuaythaipattaya||  Lumpinee Stadium || Bangkok, Thailand|| KO (Left hook to the body) || 1 ||
|-  style="text-align:center; background:#CCFFCC;"
| 2017-08-06 || Win ||align=left| Gukkorn Lianresort|| Suk Wanchai MuayThai Super Fight || Nagoya, Japan || KO (Left Body Hook) || 2 || 2:55
|-  style="text-align:center; background:#CCFFCC;"
| 2017-04-12 || Win ||align=left| Jamtalay || Rajadamnern Stadium || Bangkok, Thailand|| KO  || 2 ||
|-  style="text-align:center; background:#CCFFCC;"
| 2017-03-05 || Win ||align=left| Yuya Kosaka || Muay Lok 2017 1st, Final || Tokyo, Japan || Decision (Unanimous) || 5 || 3:00
|-
! style=background:white colspan=9 |
|-  style="text-align:center; background:#CCFFCC;"
| 2017-03-05 || Win ||align=left| Yuri || Muay Lok 2017 1st, Semi Final || Tokyo, Japan || KO || 1 || 2:34
|-  style="text-align:center; background:#CCFFCC;"
| 2017-02-06 || Win ||align=left| Kongchaiden ThorPhran49  || Rajadamnern Stadium || Bangkok, Thailand || KO || 1 ||
|-  style="text-align:center; background:#CCFFCC;"
| 2016-11-20 || Win ||align=left| Bunta Tanouchi || HOOST CUP KINGS NAGOYA II ～REVOLUTION || Nagoya, Japan || Decision (Unanimous) || 3 || 3:00
|-  style="text-align:center; background:#CCFFCC;"
| 2016-06-19 || Win ||align=left| Towakiew Kiatkampon|| Wanchai+Kingthong Rajadamnern Stadium || Bangkok, Thailand || KO (Left Body Hook) || 2 || 2:57
|-  style="text-align:center; background:#CCFFCC;"
| 2016-02-13 || Win ||align=left| Chadpayak Toyturakijbanteng|| Lumpinee Stadium || Bangkok, Thailand || TKO  || 2 ||
|-  style="text-align:center; background:#c5d2ea;"
| 2015-12-27 || No Contest ||align=left| Daiki || Hoost Cup Kings Nagoya || Nagoya, Japan || (Doctor Stop/Headbutt) || 1|| 2:28
|-  style="text-align:center; background:#c5d2ea;"
| 2015-05-10 || Draw ||align=left| Issei Ishii || Wanchai + PK MuayThai Super Fight || Nagoya, Japan || Decision || 3|| 3:00
|-  style="text-align:center; background:#CCFFCC;"
| 2015-02-10 || Win ||align=left| Phetsmuslim Kitchikes ||  || Nakhon Pathom, Thailand || TKO || 1||
|-  style="text-align:center; background:#c5d2ea;"
| 2014-12-27 || Draw ||align=left| Issei Ishii || Hoost Cup FOREVER～Kick yo、Eien ni ！～ || Nagoya, Japan || Decision || 3 || 3:00
|-  style="text-align:center; background:#FFBBBB;"
| 2014-08-17 || Loss ||align=left| Hunter Vanhoose|| MUAYTHAI WINDY SUPER FIGHT vol.17 || Tokyo, Japan || Decision (Unanimous) || 3 || 3:00
|-  style="text-align:center; background:#CCFFCC;"
| 2014-03-23 || Win ||align=left| Kaito Gibu || HOOST CUP LEGEND|| Nagoya, Japan || Decision (Unanimous) || 3 || 3:00
|-  style="text-align:center; background:#CCFFCC;"
| 2014-01-12 || Win ||align=left| Yuzuki Sakai|| MUAYTHAI WINDY SUPER FIGHT ～Muaythaiphoon～|| Nagoya, Japan || Decision (Unanimous) || 3 || 3:00
|-
| colspan=9 | Legend:    

|-  style="background:#CCFFCC;"
| 2013-09-23 ||Win ||align=left| Genki Takeno || Amateur Shootboxing || Japan||  ||  ||
|-  style="background:#CCFFCC;"
| 2013-08-11 ||Win ||align=left| Shogo Hosoda || MUAY THAI WINDY SUPER FIGHT vol.14 || Tokyo, Japan|| KO ||2  ||
|-  style="background:#FFBBBB;"
| 2011-10-23 ||Loss ||align=left| Ueda || Nagoya Kick || Nagoya, Japan||  Decision (Majority)|| 2 || 2:00
|-  style="background:#CCFFCC;"
| 2011-10-16 ||Win||align=left| Tsuchiya || BRIDGE one match challenge 18th　 || Aichi Prefecture, Japan||  Decision ||  ||
|-  style="background:#CCFFCC;"
| 2011-10-16 ||Win||align=left|  || BRIDGE one match challenge 18th　 || Aichi Prefecture, Japan||  Decision ||  ||
|-  style="background:#FFBBBB;"
| 2011-02-20 ||Loss||align=left| Yukari Yamaguchi || Striking Challenge Shootboxing　 || Nagoya, Japan||  Decision || 2 || 2:00
|-  style="background:#c5d2ea;"
| 2011-02-20 ||Draw||align=left| Kentaro Miyachi || Striking Challenge Shootboxing　 || Nagoya, Japan||  Decision || 2 || 2:00
|-  style="background:#CCFFCC;"
| 2010-11-07 ||Win||align=left| Hiroaki Osanai || BRIDGE　one match challenge 15th || Aichi Prefecture, Japan||  Decision || 2 || 2:00
|-  style="background:#c5d2ea;"
| 2010-02-21 ||Draw||align=left| Jun Sugishita || BRIDGE　one match challenge 13th || Aichi Prefecture, Japan||  Decision || 2 || 2:00
|-  style="background:#FFBBBB;"
| 2010-01-24 ||Loss||align=left| Toraji Ootahara || KAMINARIMON || Aichi Prefecture, Japan||  Decision (Unanimous) || 3|| 2:00
|-
! style=background:white colspan=9 |
|-  style="background:#cfc;"
| 2009-10-25 ||Win||align=left| Shohei Miura || KAMINARIMON, Final || Tokyo, Japan||  Decision (Unanimous) || 1|| 2:00
|-  style="background:#cfc;"
| 2009-10-25 ||Win||align=left| Yuta Shinozaki || KAMINARIMON, Semi Final || Tokyo, Japan||  Decision (Unanimous) || 1|| 2:00
|-  style="background:#CCFFCC;"
| 2009-10-18 ||Win||align=left| Ayumu Saito || BRIDGE　one match challenge 12th || Tokyo, Japan||  Decision (Unanimous) || 2|| 2:00
|-
| colspan=9 | Legend:

See also
 List of male kickboxers

References

1996 births
Living people
Japanese male kickboxers
Japanese Muay Thai practitioners
Flyweight kickboxers
Sportspeople from Nagoya